Events from the year 1492 in Ireland.

Incumbent
Lord: Henry VII

Events
 March – pretender to the English throne Perkin Warbeck is brought from Cork to Harfleur by the fleet of Charles VIII of France.
 The Butler – Fitzgerald dispute is resolved at the 'door of reconciliation' in St Patrick's Cathedral, Dublin.
 Archbishop Walter Fitzsimon is appointed Lord Deputy of Ireland.
 James Ormonde is appointed Lord Treasurer of Ireland.
 Alexander Plunket is appointed Lord Chancellor of Ireland.

Births

Deaths
October 25 – Thaddeus McCarthy, Bishop of Ross, then Bishop of Cork and Cloyne (b. c. 1455)
James Fleming, 7th Baron Slane, member of the Parliament of Ireland (from sweating sickness).
Aedh Mac Fhlannchaidh, brehon lawyer and Ollamh of Thomond.

References

 
1490s in Ireland
Ireland
Years of the 15th century in Ireland